Carlos Roberto Pereira da Silva (born 22 March 1946) is a Brazilian association football manager. He managed Bengal Mumbai FC in the Mumbai Football League from 2008 to 2009.

References

1946 births
Living people
Churchill Brothers FC Goa managers
Mohun Bagan AC managers
Brazilian expatriates in India
Brazilian expatriates in Singapore
Brazilian football managers
East Bengal Club managers
I-League managers
Expatriate football managers in India
Expatriate football managers in Sudan
Expatriate football managers in Singapore
Boavista F.C. managers
Home United FC head coaches
Al-Merrikh SC managers
Aizawl FC managers